Central Bikol, commonly called Bikol Naga or simply as Bikol, is an Austronesian language spoken by the Bicolanos, primarily in the Bicol Region of southern Luzon, Philippines. It is spoken in the northern and western part of Camarines Sur, second congressional district of Camarines Norte, eastern part of Albay, northeastern part of Sorsogon, San Pascual town in Masbate, and southwestern part of Catanduanes. Central Bikol speakers can be found in all provinces of Bicol and it is a majority language in Camarines Sur. The standard sprachraum form is based on the Canaman dialect.

Central Bikol features some vocabulary not found in other Bikol languages nor in other members of the Central Philippine language family like Tagalog and Cebuano. The word  ('night') is another example of this as it is different from the usual Bikol word  but closer to the word  of Kapampangan. There is no formal study on the relationship of the Central Luzon languages to Central Bikol but the latter has several words that are also found in the archaic form of Tagalog spoken in the Rizal and Quezon provinces that are believed to be the home of Central Luzon languages such as Kapampangan in Pampanga and southern Tarlac, and Sambalic languages in Zambales province.

Central Bikol dialects
Because of its broad geographic coverage as compared to other Bikol languages separated by islands and mountains, Central Bikol diverged into six dialects, which are still mutually comprehensible. The division of the language into different dialects is mainly because of the influence of other Bikol and non-Bikol languages surrounding the region.

The Canaman dialect, despite being used only by a small portion of the population in Camarines Sur, is the standard form of Central Bikol used in literature, Catholic religious rites and mass media. Naga City dialect is spoken in the first, second, third districts (except in Del Gallego, where residents are mostly Tagalog speakers), and in the western and eastern portions of the fourth district (Caramoan, Garchitorena, Presentacion, Siruma and Tinambac) of Camarines Sur. It is also spoken in San Pascual, Masbate (Burias Island) and the southwestern part of Catanduanes. The Partido dialect is spoken in the eastern part of Camarines Sur centered in the southern portion of the fourth districts (Goa, Lagonoy, Sagñay, San Jose, and Tigaon). The Tabaco-Legazpi-Sorsogon (TLS) dialect is spoken in the eastern coast of Albay and the northeastern part of Sorsogon. TLS is the dialect that has been most influenced by the Inland Bikol languages. The Daet dialect, on the other hand, is spoken in the second district of the province of Camarines Norte. The Virac dialect (or Viracnon language) is spoken around Virac, Catanduanes and surrounding towns on the southeastern part of the island of Catanduanes.

Dialectal comparison of Central Bikol

Like other Philippine languages, Bikol has a number of loanwords, largely Spanish as a result of 333 years of Spanish rule in the Philippines. Another source of loanwords is Sanskrit, with words like  ('responsibility') and karma.

Phonology

Consonants 
There are 16 consonants in the Bikol language: . Eight sounds are borrowed from loanwords: . 

The sound system of the language according to Mintz in 1971 is as follows.

Notes 

 Ex:  ('look', Bikol Naga) becomes  ('look', Bikol Legazpi)

Vowels 

Grammar

Particles
Like many other Philippine languages, Bikol has a rich set of discourse particles.

  – used for emphasis determined by context
  – giving a chance to someone; polite insisting
  – quoting information from a secondary source
  - emphasizing the condition that intensifies the difficulties.
  – interrogative particle
  - although
  - then
  – (Tagalog:) likeness or similitude. English: 'It looks like, it's as if'.
  – 'exactly'
  – 'not exactly, not really'
  – 'maybe, could be'
  – 'again'
  – 'I hope (something did / did not happen' ; 'If only ...' (conditionality of past events)
 ,  – 'only, just'
  – hoping that something will happen, or expressing surrender/assent
  – (Tagalog:) 'also' or 'ever' (such as  'whatever' and  'whoever')
  - 1. relenting or agreeing 2. one is yielding 3. stating what actually happened
  – 'first' or 'yet'
  – 'now' or 'already'
  – 'again'
  – (Tagalog:) 'really, truly, absolutely' (adds a sense of certainty)
  – 'I said'
  - we (inclusive)
  - we (exclusive)
  – expresses fate ("This is helpless") or a plea for others not to insist
  – indicates to a person what they should say to another
  – 'in the future', 'later' (span of time)
  – expresses a hypothetical event/situation
  – 'still'
  – expresses surprise or sudden realization
  – politeness marker;  in some Bikol dialects due to the influence of Tagalog.
  – 'immediately, right away'
  – 'really', 'truly'

Numbers

Numerals
There exist two names for numerals in Bikol: native Bikol and Spanish names. Generally, Bicolanos use the Spanish terms when referring to time, like  ('5 o'clock'). However, native terms can be read in literary books. Spanish terms for numerals can be encountered in pricing.

Tamanggot/Rapsak
The Tamanggot, Rapsak, or Bicol angry register is used when angry, speaking in a high-pitched voice, and/or shouting. Some examples of the register include:

Note:
 - It depends on the dialect of Bikol, in other dialects the "Sarwal" is Shorts while in others it is underwear.

See also
Bikol languages

Notes

References

 Lobel, Jason William, Wilmer Joseph S Tria, and Jose Maria Z Carpio. 2000. An satuyang tataramon / A study of the Bikol language. Naga City, Philippines: Lobel & Tria Partnership, Co.: Holy Rosary Minor Seminary.

 Mattes, Veronika. 2014.Types of Reduplication: A Case Study of Bikol. Walter de Gruyter GmbH, Berlin/Boston.

External links

 Translate Bikol

Bikol languages
Languages of Camarines Norte
Languages of Camarines Sur
Languages of Albay
Languages of Sorsogon
Languages of Catanduanes
Languages of Masbate
Articles_with_Central_Bikol-language_sources_(bcl)